The Acropolis International was a chess tournament held in Athens.
The longest running international chess tournament in Greece, the first event, an international invitation tournament was won by Luděk Pachman in 1968.

The next event was not held until 1977, but subsequently it has been organized on a fairly regular basis by the Greek Chess Federation, including sometimes another minor event for men and a tournament for women, too.

The 2007 tournament was part of the Association of Chess Professionals Tour (ACP Tour). The 2009 open tournament took place in Chalkida on the island of Euboea and was won by Borki Predojević on tie-break. It turned out to be the last one.

The inaugural Acropolis was played as a round robin (all-play-all), then the format varied across the series, switching several times between closed and open tournaments played in Swiss system, totaling 24 editions.

Note: In the following list of the winners at Acropolis ICT, only the best player on tie-break is indicated if there were shared first places.

Winners
{| class="wikitable sortable"
|+ Acropolis International in Athens
! # !! Year !! Winner
|-
|  1 || 1968 || 
|-
|  2 || 1977 || 
|-
|  3 || 1978 || 
|-
|  4 || 1979 || 
|-
|  5 || 1980 || 
|-
|  6 || 1982 || 
|-
|  7 || 1983 || 
|-
|  8 || 1984 || 
|-
|  9 || 1985 || 
|-
| 10 || 1986 || 
|-
| 11 || 1987 || 
|-
| 12 || 1988 || 
|-
| 13 || 1989 || 
|-
| 14 || 1991 || 
|-
| 15 || 1992 || 
|-
| 16 || 1993 || 
|-
| 17 || 1997 || 
|-
| 18 || 2003 || 
|-
| 19 || 2004 || 
|-
| 20 || 2005 || 
|-
| 21 || 2006 || 
|-
| 22 || 2007 || 
|-
| 23 || 2008 || 
|-
| 24 || 2009 || 
|}

References

External links

Chess competitions
Chess in Greece
Annual sports competitions in Athens
1968 establishments in Greece
Recurring sporting events established in 1968
2009 disestablishments in Greece
Recurring sporting events disestablished in 2009